Dominguinhos ao vivo is a 2001 live album recorded by the Brazilian singer and composer Dominguinhos. Recorded in Sesc Pompéia Theatre, São Paulo, Brazil, the album presents many of the best hits of his career, including his partnerships with Chico Buarque and Gilberto Gil

Track listing

Personnel
Dominguinhos: vocals and accordion

References

Dominguinhos albums
2001 live albums